Tu Bhi Royega is a 2020 Hindi romantic song released by Zee Music Company under its "Originals" moniker.
The song is thought to be the sequel of "Rula Ke Gaya Ishq".

Release
The song was released on 27 February 2020 on  Zee Music Company's official YouTube channel.

Audience response
The music video for the song has been viewed more than 100,000,000 times as of 25 March 2022.

References

2020 songs